Tenghuang (also known by various names as Chenghuang, Feihuang, Guhuangm, and Cuihuang) is a mythological creature which is symbol of auspiciousness in Chinese mythology. It is mentioned in the Shanhaijing.

Appearance
There are two versions of what Tenghuang looked like. It is said to be a beast like a fox, with wings and horns like a dragon on its back. The life span of those who ride it can grow to two thousand years. Another claim states that it has the appearance of a horse.

Folk sayings
There is an idiom in Chinese, "Flying the Yellow Tengda" (飛黃騰達) or "Riding on the Tenghuang". It is used to describe a person ascending and gaining a high position or reputation.

References

Chinese legendary creatures